Lee Min-ji (born 25 June 1999) is a South Korean weightlifter. She won the gold medal in the women's 76kg event at the 2021 World Weightlifting Championships held in Tashkent, Uzbekistan.

Achievements

References

External links 
 

Living people
1999 births
Place of birth missing (living people)
South Korean female weightlifters
World Weightlifting Championships medalists
21st-century South Korean women
20th-century South Korean women